Kfar Abida, (sometimes spelled Kfar Aabida or Kfaraabida)  is a village located  south of Batroun in the Batroun District of the North Governorate in Lebanon. On the coast, in the southwest of the town, lies an archaeological tell, Tell Fadous. Located south of the tell, is Fadous Sud, a Heavy Neolithic site of the Qaraoun culture.

References

External links

Batroun
Mediterranean port cities and towns in Lebanon
Populated coastal places in Lebanon
Batroun
Archaeological sites in Lebanon
Heavy Neolithic sites
Neolithic settlements
Maronite Christian communities in Lebanon